Birżebbuġa (sometimes shortened to B'Buġa) is a seaside town in the Southern Region of Malta, close to Marsaxlokk.

The town is popular among Maltese holidaymakers, and is known for its sandy beach, Pretty Bay. The village is also notable for its important archaeological sites, especially Għar Dalam, Ta' Kaċċatura and Borġ in-Nadur.

Etymology
"Birżebbuġa" means "well of olives" in the Maltese language. Such linguistic evidence established early inhabitants were in the south of the island since the first millennium. The name also indicates climate and food.

History

Prehistory

Near the village of Birżebbuġa is Għar Dalam, meaning a dark cave. Għar Dalam Cave is a highly important site, as it was here that the earliest evidence of human presence on Malta was discovered. Artefacts date back to the Neolithic Period some 7,400 years ago. The display area consists of two parts: the cave and the museum, which exhibit a remarkable wealth of finds from animal bones to human artefacts. An overlaying river running at right angles formed the cave. It is some 144 metres deep, but only the first fifty metres are open to visitors.

The lowermost layers, more than 500,000 years old, contain the fossil bones of dwarf elephants, hippopotami, micro-mammals and birds. Above the pebble layer is the so-called ‘deer’ layer, dating to around 18,000 years ago. The top layer dates to less than 10,000 years and holds evidence of the first humans on the Island. Experts hold that these remains suggest that the Islands were once a land bridge to continental Europe.

Other remains include those of a prehistoric temple or settlement, Borġ in-Nadur, which dates from the Bronze Age. The settlement was fortified with a large stone wall, still visible today. These temple ruins are important because they reveal not only a four-apse temple (c.2000 BC), but an authentic, fortified Bronze Age domestic settlement. The remains of a large, defensive wall lie nearby, running across the head of a promontory between two valleys leading down to two bays. The wall was built facing inland. The village would have had the sea to its back. This logistic situation leads scholars to believe that the people living in the village were more afraid of being attacked by invaders by land rather than from the sea.

Traces of Bronze Age huts were discovered lying just behind the wall. The depth of the deposits was very shallow, covering the remains of the Temple Period. Archaeologists have found evidence that shows that the Neolithic population became extinct and the islands were uninhabited. Archaeologists think that this could have been due to no agricultural produce, civil warfare, or the Neolithic population being murdered by war-like tribes. Archaeologists have uncovered the remains of the three apses (semi-circular rooms) of the temple. Beyond the main entrance, there is a wide elliptical area about 25 m long and 15 m wide.  Only the Trilithon Entrance remains. Visits to these sites can be arranged by appointment.

Birżebbuġa also has cart ruts that lead into the sea and run along the sea floor. A Roman villa can be found across the valley from Għar Dalam, at Ta' Kaċċatura.

Modern history
In addition to prehistoric sites, the town includes historical structures and remains that date back centuries, revealing changing peoples as the island went through different periods of domination by various political interests. Such structures include Ferretti Battery, Pinto Battery, and the Birżebbuġa entrenchments. These sites date back to the rule of the Order of Saint John, who ruled the Maltese islands from 1530 to 1798. Napoleon ejected the Order from Malta, and later the island came under Great Britain.

During the British period, Fort Benghisa, RAF Kalafrana and RAF Hal Far were built in Birżebbuġa.

Churches tell part of the history of the town: 
 St George's Church (1575, reopened in 1683).  In the earth nearby are traces of prehistoric cart ruts.
 the Chapel of the Good Shepherd, 
 the Chapel of the Immaculate Conception, Bengħisa (1822, enlarged in 1862),
 the Holy Family Chapel (1865),
 the Chapel of Our Lady Help of Christians (1839), private; 
 St Joseph’s Chapel (1871), private; and
 the Church of Our Lady of Sorrows (1909), which served as the parish church until 1938. Birżebbuġa became a formal parish on 9 September 1913, with a resident priest. Some time later, the parish worked to build a larger church. St. Peter in Chains opened for worship on 12 June 1938. The present parish priest is Rev. Can. Fr Anton Galea-Scannura.

A monument in Birżebbuġa commemorates the Malta Summit, which took place close by on 3 December 1989.

During the last decade, there has been an influx of new workers employed at the nearby Malta Freeport and container terminal. In addition, new residents have come from the neighbouring villages, Birzebbuġa now hosts some 10,000 people.

The town is built around the beach, which puts it close to many shops and restaurants along the coastline. Some vacationers prefer the rocky shore in the neighbouring St George's Bay, ideal for sunbathing and snorkelling. Sailing is popular throughout the year. St George's Bay is also used by local fishermen who moor their boats at the inlet. St George's Bay is famous for its Cart Ruts that go across the small sandy Bay.

Transport

To get to Birzebbuga from Valletta you will have to board either the 82, 80 or X4 bus. The X4 passes every 30 minutes to Birzebbuga, 80 every hour and 82 passes every 15 minutes during the rush hour and 20–30 minutes at other times.

There are two other routes that pass from Birzebbuga; route 210 which travels to and from Mater Dei Hospital and the University of Malta; and route 119 which travels through Birzebbuga and ends at the Malta International Airport and Marsascala.

Coat of arms
Birżebbuġa's coat of arms shows a blue chevron and olive branch on a white field.  The blue represents the nearby waters of the Mediterranean Sea and the olive branch the major importance of olives to the local economy, in former times.

Sports
The locality hosts a number of football teams. Birżebbuġa St. Peter's F.C. currently compete in Group A of the Maltese National Amateur League (after a merging of the now defunct Maltese Second Division and the Maltese Third Division), after languishing at the bottom of Maltese football for years. The highest tier Birzebbugia St. Peter's has played in was the Maltese First Division. The club was promoted to this division in 2010, due to a league expansion, but was subsequently relegated in 2015.  As well as its Seniors' team, the club also possesses a prosperous nursery which is run by Birzebbuga Windmills FC.

Birzebbuga St. Peters' is also in a collaboration with a newly founded futsal team, Birzebbuga St. Peters' FC Futsal, which is competing in the Maltese Futsal Fourth Division Section A . Apart from these clubs, an amateur football team is also present, Birzebbuga Tigers FC.

Birzebbuga also has its own water polo team, Birzebbuga A.S.C. (also known as Birzebbugia Freeport), which plays in the Maltese Waterpolo First Division.

Furthermore, Birzebbuga has its own 'Boċċi' club, which competes in the Second Division of the Maltese Bocci Federation League.

Zones in Birżebbuġa

Bengħisa
Borġ in-Nadur
Brolli
Girgħien
Għar Dalam
Għar Ħasan, limits of Ħal Far 
Ħal Far
Kalafrana 
L-Arblu, limits of Ħal Far
L-Artal, limits of Ħal Far 
L-Imwadar, limits of Bengħisa
Pretty Bay (Il-Bajja s-Sabiħa) 
Qajjenza 
St. George's Bay (Bajja San Ġorġ) 
Ta' Ġiliġejla, limits of Bengħisa 
Ta' Salvun, limits of Ħal Far 
Ta' Sansajna 
Ta' Żgħer, limits of Ħal Far
Tal-Għawejra, limits of Ħal Far 
Tal-Papa
Tal-Kuġin
Tax-Xerriek
Wied Dalam
Wied il-Buni
Wied ix-Xoqqa, limits of Bengħisa 
Wied Qoton
Wied Żembaq
Wied Żnuber, limits of Ħal Far 
Xoqqiet, limits of Bengħisa

Twin towns
 Porto San Giorgio, Italy
 Azas, France

References

 
Towns in Malta
Local councils of Malta
Mediterranean port cities and towns in Malta